Sonic Citadel is the seventh studio album by American noise rock band Lightning Bolt. It was released in October 2019 under Thrill Jockey Records.

Track listing

References

External links
 Sonic Citadel at Thrill Jockey Records

2019 albums
Thrill Jockey albums
Lightning Bolt (band) albums